Tian An Centre is a commercial office building and skyscraper located at 338 West Nanjing Road in Shanghai, China.

References

External links
 

Buildings and structures in Shanghai
Huangpu District, Shanghai